Sir Dominic Anthony Gerard Asquith  (born 7 February 1957) is a British career diplomat and former Ambassador to Iraq, Egypt, and Libya. He was First Secretary at the British Embassy in Washington DC. He was most recently the British High Commissioner to the Republic of India.

Background and education

Asquith is the younger son of The 2nd Earl of Oxford and Asquith and Anne (born Palairet). He was a great-grandson of H. H. Asquith, the former British Prime Minister.  Asquith's elder brother Raymond, father Lord Oxford, and maternal grandfather Sir Michael Palairet, all served as British diplomats. Like his father and brother, he was educated at Ampleforth College.

In 1975 he was involved in the Musa Alami project in the West Bank, Palestine, and worked as a researcher at the Institute of Palestine Studies in Beirut.

In 1981 he worked as a freelance journalist in Amman, Jordan and then as the Executive Secretary to the Parliamentary Association for Euro-Arab Co-operation in London, until 1983.

Diplomatic career

Asquith joined HM Diplomatic Service in 1983 as part of the Soviet department and served at Damascus, Muscat, Washington, D.C., Buenos Aires and Riyadh before being appointed Deputy Head of Mission in Iraq in 2004, Director of the Iraq Directorate at the Foreign and Commonwealth Office 2004–06 and Ambassador to Iraq 2006–07. He was Ambassador to Egypt 2007–11 and Ambassador to Libya 2011–12.

On 4 December 2009, Asquith gave evidence before Parliament to The Iraq Inquiry.

Asquith survived an assassination attempt in June 2012 when a British convoy was hit by a rocket-propelled grenade. In September 2012 Asquith had to extend a routine break from Libya for medical treatment and in January 2013 he was officially replaced by Michael Aron.

Asquith was appointed a Companion of the Order of St Michael and St George in 2004, and knighted as a Knight Commander of the Order of St Michael and St George in the 2012 New Year Honours.

After spending a few years in the private sector, Asquith returned to diplomatic life, taking charge as High Commissioner to India in April 2016. He concluded his four-year stint in India in January 2020.

Outside work

In May 2013 Asquith took an unpaid position leading a trade delegation to Libya organised by the Libyan British Business Council.

In June 2013 Sir Dominic took a paid position as senior consultant with Tatweer Research, a Libyan research and development company, specialising in technology and engineering.

Career overview

1983–1984 Diplomat, Soviet Dept
1984–1985 Diplomat, Southern Europe Dept
1986–1987 Second Secretary, Damascus, Syria
1987–1989 First Secretary (Chancery), Muscat
1989–1990 Diplomat, EC Dept (Internal) Dept
1990–1992 Private Secretary to Minister of State FCO
1992–1996 First Secretary, Washington DC, USA
1996 Drugs and International Crime Dept FCO
1997–2001 Minister and Dep Head of Mission, Buenos Aires
2001–2004 Deputy Head of Mission and Consul-General, Riyadh, Saudi Arabia
2004 Deputy Special Representative for Iraq, and Deputy Head of Mission, Baghdad, Iraq
2004–2006 Director Iraq, FCO
2006–2007 HM Ambassador to Iraq
2007–2011 HM Ambassador to Egypt
2011–2012 UK Special Representative, then Ambassador, to Libya
2013–2015 Senior Advisor, Dentons LLP
2016–2020 British High Commissioner to India

Personal life

Asquith was married in 1988 to Louise Cotton, who had worked as a secretary in the British Foreign Office and resigned upon her marriage. Sir Dominic and Lady Asquith have four children:

 Gabriela Elizabeth Louise Asquith (born 1989)
 Helena Lucy Anne Asquith (born 1990)
 Thomas Anthony Gerard Asquith (born 1992)
 William Raphael Augustine Asquith (born 1994)

References

External links
Libyan British Business Council website
Tatweer Research website
Burke's Peerage & Baronetage website

1957 births
Living people
English Roman Catholics
Dominic Asquith
Younger sons of earls
People educated at Ampleforth College
Ambassadors of the United Kingdom to Egypt
Ambassadors of the United Kingdom to Iraq
Ambassadors of the United Kingdom to Libya
High Commissioners of the United Kingdom to India
Knights Commander of the Order of St Michael and St George